Toyland Tours was a former attraction in the Land of Make Believe area of Alton Towers theme park, Staffordshire, England. The attraction was opened in 1994, replacing Around the World in 80 Days and took riders on an animated boat tour of an eccentric toy factory.

It featured many animated gags and an energetic soundtrack. A video game scene was sponsored by Sega, featuring Sonic the Hedgehog.

Early in the 2005 season it was announced that Toyland Tours would be closing, to be replaced by Charlie and the Chocolate Factory: The Ride the following year.

External links 
Toyland Tours at Alton Towers Almanac
Toyland Tours at darkrides.co.uk
Toyland Tours at Towers Nerd

1994 establishments in the United Kingdom
2005 disestablishments in the United Kingdom
Dark rides
Water rides manufactured by Mack Rides
Water rides
Alton Towers
Sonic the Hedgehog